The 2018 United States House of Representatives elections in Massachusetts were held on November 6, 2018, electing the nine U.S. representatives from the Commonwealth of Massachusetts, one from each of the state's nine congressional districts. The elections coincided with the elections of other offices, including a gubernatorial election, other elections to the House of Representatives, elections to the United States Senate, and various state and local elections. The primary election for contested nominations was held on September 4, 2018.

On the night of the election, all nine races were declared in favor of the Democratic Party candidates. Seven seats went to incumbents seeking re-election: Richard Neal (1st District), Jim McGovern (2nd), Joseph Kennedy III (4th), Katherine Clark (5th), Seth Moulton (6th), Stephen F. Lynch (8th), and Bill Keating (9th). In the 7th District, Ayanna Pressley ran unopposed after defeating the incumbent in the primary election. In the 3rd District, where the incumbent did not seek re-election, Lori Trahan was declared the winner.

Statewide

By district

Results of the 2018 United States House of Representatives elections in Massachusetts by district:

District 1

The 1st congressional district is located in western and Central Massachusetts. The largest Massachusetts district in area, it covers about 1/3 of the state and is more rural than the rest. It has the state's highest point, Mount Greylock. The district includes the cities of Springfield, West Springfield, Pittsfield, Holyoke, and Westfield. The district has a PVI of D+12. The incumbent is Democrat Richard Neal, who has represented the district since 2013 and previously represented the 2nd district from 1989 to 2013. He was re-elected with 73% of the vote in 2016. For the 4th election cycle in a row, no Republicans filed to run in this district.

Democratic primary

Primary results

General election

Results

District 2

The 2nd congressional district is located in central Massachusetts. It contains the cities of Worcester, which is the second-largest city in New England after Boston, and Northampton in the Pioneer Valley. The district has a PVI of D+9.
The incumbent is Democrat Jim McGovern, who has represented the district since 2013 and previously represented the 3rd district from 1997 to 2013. He was re-elected unopposed with 98% of the vote in 2016.

Democratic primary

Primary results

Republican primary

Primary results

General election

Results

District 3

The 3rd congressional district is located in northeastern and central Massachusetts. It contains the Merrimack valley including Lowell, Lawrence and Haverhill. The district has a PVI of D+9.
The incumbent is Democrat Niki Tsongas, who has represented the district since 2013 and previously represented the 5th district from 2007 to 2013. She was re-elected with 69% of the vote in 2016.

Tsongas is retiring, and did not seek re-election in 2018.

Democratic primary

Candidates
Declared
 Jeffrey Ballinger, labor organizer
 Alexandra Chandler, former Naval Intelligence officer
 Beej Das, president and CEO of Troca Hotels
 Rufus Gifford, former United States Ambassador to Denmark and financial director in Barack Obama's 2012 reelection campaign
 Leonard Golder, chairman of the Stow Democratic Town Committee and former Stow selectman
 Daniel Koh, former chief of staff to Boston mayor Marty Walsh
 Barbara L'Italien, State Senator
 Bopha Malone, vice president of Enterprise Bank
 Juana Matias, state representative
 Lori Trahan, former chief of staff to Marty Meehan

Withdrawn
 Steve Kerrigan, former CEO of the DNC and nominee for lieutenant governor in 2014
 Nadeem Mazen, Cambridge City Councillor
 Patrick Littlefield, executive director of the U.S. Department of Veterans Affairs’ Center for Innovation 

Declined
 Jennifer Benson, state representative
 Stephen DiNatale, Mayor of Fitchburg and former state representative (endorsed Gifford)
 Eileen Donoghue, state senator, former mayor of Lowell and candidate for MA-05 in 2007
 Jamie Eldridge, state senator and candidate for MA-05 in 2007
 Rodney Elliott, Lowell city councilor and former mayor of Lowell
 Barry Finegold, former state senator, candidate for MA-05 in 2007 and candidate for State Treasurer in 2014
 James Fiorentini, Mayor of Haverhill (Endorsed Koh)
 Michael W. Gallagher, attorney and former Lowell School Committee member
 Ellen Murphy Meehan, hospital consultant and ex-wife of former Congressman Martin Meehan
 David Nangle, state representative
 Steven Panagiotakos, former state senator
 Dan Rivera, Mayor of Lawrence (endorsed Matias)
 Niki Tsongas, incumbent U.S. Representative

Endorsements

Polling

Primary results

Lori Trahan and Daniel Koh were separated by less than one half of one percent of the votes cast. Koh subsequently requested a recount, which confirmed Trahan's victory.

Republican primary

Candidates
Declared
 Rick Green, businessman

Declined
 Mary Burns, political activist and small business owner
 Sheila Harrington, state representative
 Scott Gunderson, retired Naval officer; dropped out
 Mark Hawke, Mayor of Gardner
 Mike Kuenzler, businessman
 Beth Lindstrom, former aide to Mitt Romney (Running for U.S. Senate)
 Salvatore Lupoli, businessman and founder and CEO of Sal's Pizza
 Ann Wofford, nominee in 2014 and 2016

Primary results

General election

Results

District 4

The 4th congressional district is located mostly in southern Massachusetts. It contains Bristol, Middlesex, Norfolk, Plymouth and Worcester counties. The district has a PVI of D+9.
The incumbent is Democrat Joe Kennedy III, who has represented the district since 2013. He was re-elected with 70% of the vote in 2016.

Kennedy is running for re-election. No Republicans filed to run.

Democratic primary

Primary results

General election

Results

District 5

The 5th congressional district is located in eastern Massachusetts. It contains Middlesex, Suffolk and Worcester counties. The district has a PVI of D+18. The incumbent is Democrat Katherine Clark, who has represented the district since winning a special election in 2013. She was re-elected unopposed with 99% of the vote in 2016.

Democratic primary

Primary results

Republican primary
John Hugo is a Republican candidate for the Massachusetts' 5th congressional district in Massachusetts who is running against Katherine Clark in the United States House of Representatives elections in Massachusetts, 2018. John Hugo was certified to appear on the ballot for the 2018 elections on May 17, 2018, to run against Katherine Clark.

Primary results

General election

Results

District 6

The 6th congressional district is located in northeastern Massachusetts. It contains most of Essex County, including the North Shore and Cape Ann. The district has a PVI of D+6. The incumbent is Democrat Seth Moulton, who has represented the district since 2015. He was re-elected unopposed with 98% of the vote in 2016.

Democratic primary

Primary results

Republican primary
Joseph Schneider is running for the Republican nomination

Primary results

General election

Results

District 7

The 7th congressional district is located in eastern Massachusetts. It contains the northern three-quarters of the city of Boston, the city of Somerville and parts of the city of Cambridge. The district has a PVI of D+34. The incumbent was Democrat Mike Capuano, who has represented the district since 2013 and previously represented the 8th district from 1999 to 2013. He was re-elected unopposed with 99% of the vote in 2016.

In his bid for re-nomination by the Democratic Party, Capuano was defeated by Boston city councillor Ayanna Pressley.
The primary victory was a surprise, as the last poll before the election showed Capuano with a significant lead, 48% to 35%. Part of the reason the polls may have been inaccurate is a surge in the number of primary voters. 24% of District 7 voters in the 2018 primary had not voted in the five previous primaries, and that percentage was disproportionately of Hispanic and Asian ethnicities.

Democratic primary

Candidates
Declared
 Mike Capuano, incumbent representative
 Ayanna Pressley, Boston city councillor

Declined
 Nadeem Mazen, Cambridge City Councillor

Endorsements

Polling

Primary results

General election

Results

District 8

The 8th congressional district is located in eastern Massachusetts. It contains the southern quarter of the city of Boston and many of its southern suburbs. The incumbent is Democrat Stephen Lynch, who has represented the district since 2013 and previously represented the 9th district from 2001 to 2013. The district has a PVI of D+10. He was re-elected with 72% of the vote in 2016.

Lynch is running for re-election. No Republicans filed to run.

Democratic primary
Two political newcomers ran against Lynch in the primary, video game developer Brianna Wu and pilot Christopher Voehl. No debates have been held in this race.

Primary results

General election

Results

District 9

The 9th congressional district is located in eastern Massachusetts, including Cape Cod and the South Coast. It contains all of Barnstable, Dukes and Nantucket counties and parts of Bristol and Plymouth counties. The district has a PVI of D+4. The incumbent is Democrat Bill Keating, who has represented the district since 2013 and previously represented the 10th district from 2011 to 2013. He was re-elected with 56% of the vote in 2016.

Democratic primary
Bill Cimbrelo, a businessman and former environmental chemist from Osterville, has announced that he plans to challenge Keating in the September primary. Cimbrelo previously ran for U.S. Senate against former senator Scott Brown in 2012 as an independent candidate.

Primary results

Republican primary
Peter Tedeschi sought the Republican nomination; he is the former CEO of Tedeschi Food Shops.

Primary results

General election

Results

References

Further reading

External links
Candidates at Vote Smart 
Candidates at Ballotpedia 
Campaign finance at FEC 
Campaign finance at OpenSecrets

Official campaign websites for first district candidates
Richard Neal (D) for Congress

Official campaign websites for second district candidates
Paul V. Grady (I) for Congress
Tracy Lovvorn (R) for Congress
Jim McGovern (D) for Congress

Official campaign websites for third district candidates
Rick Green (R) for Congress
Lori Trahan (D) for Congress

Official campaign websites for fourth district candidates
Joe Kennedy (D) for Congress

Official campaign websites for fifth district candidates
Katherine Clark (D) for Congress
John Hugo (R) for Congress

Official campaign websites for sixth district candidates
Joe Schneider (R) for Congress
Seth Moulton (D) for Congress
Samson Racioppi (L) for Congress

Official campaign websites for seventh district candidates
Ayanna Pressley (D) for Congress

Official campaign websites for eighth district candidates
Stephen F. Lynch (D) for Congress

Official campaign websites for ninth district candidates
Bill Keating (D) for Congress
Peter Tedeschi (R) for Congress

Massachusetts
2018
United States House